Ritual is the sixth studio album by American rock band In This Moment. It was released on July 21, 2017, by Atlantic Records and Roadrunner Records. This marks the band's fifth release collaborating with producer Kevin Churko.

A concept album revolving around a witch during the Salem witch trials, Ritual is the band's first album since the departure of drummer Tom Hane, who left the band in 2016 citing creative differences. Hane was replaced by Kent Diimmel shortly afterwards. On May 11, 2017, the album title and album cover was released on the band's social media. The lead single, "Oh Lord", was released on May 12, along with the track listing, music video and digital pre-order of the album. "Oh Lord" is the band's highest charting single to date, peaking at #6 on the Top Mainstream Rock Charts.

Composition

Influences, style and themes
In February 2016, after a year and a half of touring for their previous album Black Widow, the band posted on social media a short video that hinted the recording of a new album. In a video interview, lead vocalist Maria Brink stated that she had already come up with a theme for the next record. The theme of the album is mostly inspired by Brink's visit to Salem, Massachusetts, with the women in her family in the fall of 2016. She said, "I was trying to find a lot of truth in myself. I loved Salem. I was blown away by how visually beautiful it is. The history of the witch burnings is fascinating. It was a special ceremonial journey." The album title refers to looking at different religions and spiritualities of the world. Lead guitarist Chris Howorth explained that Brink is "a very spiritual person, she's not necessarily religious like going to church religious but she's also not into all this witchcraft stuff, she kinda likes it all and believes openly. That's why its touching all these different topics of religion and stuff."

In an interview on April 10, 2017, Howorth said the sound of the Ritual has more serious themes, "Stylistically, I think we went a little bit more raw, you know—like, not so much campiness like 'Sex Metal Barbie.'" Brink says the record is less sexualized than the band's previous efforts, saying, "I wanted to show people and definitely women a different side of strength in me that was a really powerful force in me that didn't need the sexual part, so there's definitely a more serious overtone...a more serious deeper side of us." Sonically, the electronic elements found in the previous two albums, typical of industrial metal are less prominent with a greater presence of guitars. Though the album has dark aspects, there is also a positive message inspired by Brink's spiritual learning and experiences. Brink's love for Phil Collins' "In the Air Tonight" decided the band's cover on the album, which the band has attempted in the past. The writing and recording process for the album took four to five months. This time around, songs were written with the live show in mind, whereas in the past it was created after the album was completed. The band's main songwriters—Brink, Howorth, and Kevin Churko collaborated with other writers from outside their usual lyric-pool to expand the influences, such as Scott Stevens and Dave Bassett, as was recommended by the label. Genre-wise, the album is observed by reviewers to be alternative metal, hard rock, pop rock, and industrial metal. The album utilizes elements of pop, electronic, industrial, blues, alternative, and classic rock.

Release and promotion
On February 6, 2017, the band announced their North American tour titled Half God, Half Devil, which is also a track on the album. The 19-date tour kicked off on April 7, 2017. The set consisted mostly of their previous efforts, Blood and Black Widow, while also debuting three new songs from Ritual, including "River of Fire", a cover of Phil Collins' "In the Air Tonight", and the lead single "Oh Lord". The single was released on May 12, 2017. The second single, "Roots", was released on June 16, 2017, along with the lyric video. "In the Air Tonight" was released as the final pre-release single on July 14, 2017, along with a lyric video. The album's fourth and final single, "Black Wedding" (featuring Rob Halford of Judas Priest), was released on April 27, 2018, along with a music video.

Critical reception

James Christopher Monger of AllMusic wrote that "[Brink] possesses one of the most powerful and compelling voices, male or female, in the modern rock genre. Ray Horn Jr.of Blabbermouth.net noted "pop and electronic [elements]" and a "perpetual theme of repent and deliverance...[that] is still too inherently dark to cross over to FM. This naturally makes "Ritual" vastly superior." James Hickie writing for Kerrang! described the album's change in style from its predecessor as "a positive move" and stated that the band has "delivered their best vehicle to date." Chad Bower of Loudwire writes that Ritual is "their most mature album, especially lyrically, but still musically adventurous". On Brink's vocals, he writes, "outstanding voice with a lot of power and texture, and when unleashed is a potent force. The vocal effects on some of the tracks could be dialed back to allow that force to break free more often instead of being diluted" while  Metal Hammer compares the album to the band's live theatrical shows, saying "feels like it's been created as the soundtrack to In This Moment's eye-popping Lady Gaga-meets-Rob Zombie live shows rather than a standalone album" and that it's "best enjoyed with moving images". 

According to Michael Pemental of New Noise Magazine, "Ritual still has enough to keep fans happy. From their loud and joyous instrumentation, to Brink’s vocal inflection that lures listeners in, In This Moment still give off a work that is different, energetic, and fun." Simon K. writing for Sputnikmusic called Ritual "a heavy pop album with none of the great vocal performances to back it up." Kaydan Howison of Wall of Sound stated that the album's "production is sloppy; featuring an unnecessarily slather of electronics over everything."

Commercial performance
Ritual debuted at number 23 on the Billboard 200 with an estimated 22,000 copies sold in its first week, becoming the band's third highest debut on the chart to date.

Track listing

Personnel
Credits adapted from the liner notes of Ritual.

In This Moment
 Maria Brink – vocals
 Chris Howorth – lead guitar
 Randy Weitzel – rhythm guitar
 Travis Johnson – bass
 Kent Diimmell – drums

Additional musicians
 Rob Halford – guest vocals on "Black Wedding"
 Scott Stevens – piano on "Black Wedding"

Technical
 Kevin Churko – production, mixing, mastering, engineering
 Tristan Hardin – additional engineering
 Josh Connolly – additional engineering
 Khloe Churko – studio management and coordination
 Randy Weitzel – pre-production

Artwork
 Virgilio Tzaj – art direction, design
 Jason Blake – photography

Charts

Weekly charts

Year-end charts

References

2017 albums
Albums produced by Kevin Churko
Atlantic Records albums
In This Moment albums
Roadrunner Records albums